The 2022 ICC Under-19 Cricket World Cup was an international limited-overs cricket tournament that was held in the West Indies in January and February 2022 with sixteen teams taking part. It was the fourteenth edition of the Under-19 Cricket World Cup, and the first that was held in the West Indies. Bangladesh were the defending champions.

In March 2021, Cricket West Indies confirmed that the format would be the same as previous editions, with teams competing to progress to the Plate and Super League phases of the tournament. In November 2021, the International Cricket Council (ICC) confirmed the full schedule for the tournament, with matches to be played in Antigua, Guyana, Saint Kitts, and Trinidad; the final will be played at Sir Vivian Richards Stadium in Antigua. New Zealand decided to withdraw from the tournament due to the extensive mandatory quarantine restrictions for minors on their return home, with Scotland named as their replacement.

England became the first team to reach the final of the tournament, after they beat Afghanistan by 15 runs in the first Super League semi-final match. It was the first time that England had reached the final of the Under-19 Cricket World cup since winning the 1998 tournament in South Africa. In the second semi-final, India beat Australia by 96 runs, progressing to their fourth consecutive Under-19 Cricket World Cup final.

Australia beat Afghanistan in the final playoff match of the tournament to finish in third place. In the final, India beat England by four wickets to win their fifth Under-19 Cricket World Cup. Dewald Brevis of South Africa was named the Player of the Tournament, after scoring 506 runs.

Qualification

The top eleven teams from the previous tournament qualified automatically. They were joined by the five winners of regional qualification tournaments. In August 2021, the International Cricket Council (ICC) announced that the Americas, Asia, and EAP regional qualifiers had all been cancelled due to the COVID-19 pandemic. As a result, Canada, the United Arab Emirates and Papua New Guinea all qualified directly to the 2022 Under-19 Cricket World Cup based on their past performances in the last five regional qualifiers. In the African group, Uganda won the Division 1 tournament to become the final team to qualify. In the European group, Ireland beat Scotland in the regional final to qualify. However, in November 2021, the ICC confirmed that Scotland had replaced New Zealand in the tournament, after New Zealand were forced to withdraw due to the extensive mandatory quarantine restrictions placed on the return of minors due to the COVID-19 pandemic.

Umpires
On 9 January 2022, the ICC appointed the officials for the tournament. Along with the nineteen umpires, Denavon Hayles, Graeme Labrooy and Phil Whitticase were also named as the match referees.

 Rizwan Akram
 Rahul Asher
 Sameer Bandekar
 Nitin Bathi
 Roland Black
 Emmerson Carington
 Allan Haggo

 Mark Jameson
 Heath Kearns
 Arnold Maddela
 Vijaya Mallela
 David McLean
 David Millns

 Buddhi Pradhan
 Sarika Prasad
 Rashid Riaz
 Martin Saggers
 Asif Yaqoob
 Jacqueline Williams

Squads

Each team selected a squad of fifteen players for the tournament, excluding reserves, with South Africa being the first team to name their squad. Afghanistan's departure was delayed due to visa issues, resulting in their warm-up matches being cancelled. After taking part in the 2021 ACC Under-19 Asia Cup in the United Arab Emirates, the Afghanistan team flew from Dubai, via Manchester, to the Caribbean. As a result, some of the Group C fixtures were revised to accommodate Afghanistan's late arrival.

Group stage

Group A

Group B

Group C

Group D

Plate League

Plate quarter-finals

Plate playoff semi-finals

Plate semi-finals

Super League

Super League quarter-finals

Super League playoff semi-finals

Super League semi-finals

Placement matches

15th-place playoff

13th-place playoff

11th-place playoff

9th-place playoff (Plate Final)

7th-place playoff

5th-place playoff

3rd-place playoff

Final

Final standings
The final standings for the tournament were as follows:

Team of the tournament
On 6 February 2022, the ICC announced the most valuable team of the tournament.

 Haseebullah Khan (wk)
 Teague Wyllie
 Dewald Brevis
 Yash Dhull (c)
 Tom Prest
 Dunith Wellalage
 Raj Bawa
 Vicky Ostwal
 Ripon Mondol
 Awais Ali
 Joshua Boyden 
 Noor Ahmad

Notes

References

External links
 Series home at ESPN Cricinfo

ICC Under-19 Cricket World Cup
International cricket competitions in 2021–22
International cricket competitions in the West Indies
 
ICC Cricket World Cup